Boys Will Be Boys is a 1921 American comedy film directed by Clarence G. Badger and written by Edfrid A. Bingham. The film stars Will Rogers, Irene Rich, Charles Mason, Sidney Ainsworth, Edward Kimball, and Milton Ross. The film was released on May 5, 1921, by Goldwyn Pictures.

Cast       
Will Rogers as Peep O'Day
Irene Rich as Lucy
Charles Mason as Tom Minor 
Sidney Ainsworth as Sublette
Edward Kimball as Judge Priest
Milton Ross as Bagby 
Charles Thurston as Sheriff Breck 
May Hopkins as Kitty
Cordelia Callahan as Mrs. Hunter
Nick Cogley as Aunt Mandy
Burton Halbert as Farmer Bell

References

External links

1921 films
1920s English-language films
Silent American comedy films
1921 comedy films
Goldwyn Pictures films
Films directed by Clarence G. Badger
American silent feature films
American black-and-white films
1920s American films